The 1910–11 Haverford Fords men's soccer team represented Haverford College during the 1910–11 ISFL season. It was the Fords 10th season of existence. 

The Fords won the IAFL national championship this season, making it their sixth ISFA/ISFL national championship, the predecessor national soccer championship to the NCAA Division I Men's Soccer Championship. Including pre-regulation titles, it was the Fords' seventh national title.

Schedule 

|-
!colspan=6 style="background:#c91631; color:#FFFFFF; border:2px solid #000000;"| Non-conference regular season
|-

|-
!colspan=6 style="background:#c91631; color:#FFFFFF; border:2px solid #000000;"| IAFL
|-

|-

Honors

IAFL All-Americans 
 Wilmer Young, MF

References

External links 
1910–11 Season Stats

Haverford
1910
1910
Haverford Fords men's soccer
Haverford Fords men's soccer